Wrong Place is a 2022 American action film directed by Mike Burns, from a script from Bill Lawrence, and produced by Randall Emmett and George Furla. It stars Ashley Greene and Bruce Willis.

Wrong Place was released by Vertical Entertainment in limited theaters and VOD on July 15, 2022, followed by its release on DVD and Blu-ray on September 20, 2022.

Premise
The film tells the story of a methamphetamine cook who hunts down a small-town former police chief in an effort to prevent the man from delivering eyewitness testimony against his family.

Cast
 Ashley Greene as Chloe Richards
 Bruce Willis as Frank Richards
 Michael Sirow as Jake Brown
 Texas Battle as Captain East
 Stacey Danger as Tammy
 Massi Furlan as Virgil Brown

Production
In 2021, Bruce Willis signed on to star in the action film Wrong Place, with filming commencing later that year. In March 2022, the film's director Mike Burns, who previously directed another Bruce Willis film Out of Death, said, "before filming commenced on Wrong Place in 2021, I asked one of Willis's associates how the actor felt and was told he was much better than last year. I took the associates' word for it, but soon realized that Willis was worse. After I finished filming, I said, 'I'm done. I won't make another movie with Bruce Willis.' I'm relieved that he's on vacation." Wrong Place is one of the last films to star Willis, who retired from acting because he was diagnosed with frontotemporal dementia.

Release
Wrong Place was released by Vertical Entertainment in limited theaters and VOD on July 15, 2022, followed by its release on DVD and Blu-ray on September 20, 2022.

Box office
As of February 17, 2023, Wrong Place grossed $71,362 in Hungary, Turkey, and Portugal.

Critical response

Brian Orndorf, of Blu-ray.com, gave a negative review, writing "Wrong Place is as worthless and tiresome as Out of Death, and let's hope the production team doesn't make this a yearly event." Julian Roman, of MovieWeb, also gave a negative review, saying the film had an "absurd plot, terrible script, and amateurish direction." Maxwell Rabb, of Chicago Reader, gave a negative review, saying "Wrong Place is a convoluted mess that struggles to connect disjunctive plot points as they dawdle their way to the movie's inevitable conclusion". Tara McNamara, of Common Sense Media, awarded the film one star out of five, writing "throwaway action films like this one are known for featuring a former but memorable tough guy marquee name, a forgettable plot, low production budget, and a high weapon count".

References

External links
 

2020s American films
2020s English-language films
2022 action adventure films
2022 action thriller films
2022 films
2022 independent films
American action films
Vertical Entertainment films